Pagu (alt names: Pago, Pagoe), named after one of its dialects, is a North Halmahera language of Indonesia. Kao dialect is divergent.

References

Languages of Indonesia
North Halmahera languages